Marissa Johnson (born 1990/1991) is an activist who attained notoriety when she interrupted U.S. presidential candidate Bernie Sanders at an August 2015 rally in Seattle. Her activism has been associated with the Black Lives Matter movement. She is a founder of a Seattle-based justice group called Outside Agitators 206, which was disbanded when she became a cofounder of the Seattle chapter of Black Lives Matter around September 2015.

Activism
Johnson had been noted in media outlets in Seattle and beyond for her engagement and disruption of public meetings before the Sanders incident. She organized a November 2014 die-in at a Downtown Seattle shopping mall which shut down the mall on Black Friday 2014. At a January 2015 city council meeting to discuss the use of body cameras by city police, she caused suspension of the meeting and said "I don't need a home video of my oppression".

Johnson has a black father and a white mother, and she describes herself as an evangelical Christian.<ref>In Her Own Words: The Political Beliefs of the Protester Who Interrupted Bernie Sanders, Eli Sanders, The Stranger, August 11, 2015.</ref> She has cited her faith as a motivator for her activism, saying "white supremacy is sin". She graduated from Seattle Pacific University in 2013 with a degree in theology. After graduating, she went to work as a nanny.Woman who disrupted Bernie Sanders rally stands by white supremacy remarks by Richard D. Oxley, MyNorthwest.com August 18, 2015. Some writers have said she has been "smeared" as a Tea Party movement activist, and she has said that her parents were Tea Party members when she lived with them. Johnson has said that she once supported Sarah Palin as a national political candidate, and criticized "white liberal" people for being like Rachel Dolezal.

The disruption of Bernie Sanders' speech was described by Seattle political commentator Maria Tomchick in December 2015 as being an important part of the "biggest news story of 2015", the expansion of the Black Lives Matter movement into the national political stage.

Black Lives Matter Seattle chapter controversies
The Seattle BLM chapter of Black Lives Matter has been criticized while under Johnson's leadership for allowing anti-Semitic remarks at rallies in the vicinity of Uncle Ike's Pot Shop in Seattle, whose owner was accused of gentrifying a traditionally black neighborhood.

BibliographySo You Wanna Be An Ally?'', Harper Perennial 2019,

References

Further reading

External links
 

1990s births
Living people
American civil rights activists
Black Lives Matter people
Activists from Seattle
Seattle Pacific University alumni
American evangelicals
African-American activists
21st-century American women
Women civil rights activists
21st-century African-American women